Doggett Beat for Dancing Feet is an album by American organist Bill Doggett released by the King label in 1957.

Critical reception

AllMusic reviewer Bill Dhal stated "Doggett's fatback organ cooks in tandem with Butler's licks and Scott's sax".

Track listing
 "Soft" (Tiny Bradshaw) – 2:33
 "And the Angels Sing" (Ziggy Elman, Johnny Mercer) – 2:40
 "Ding Dong" (Bill Doggett, Billy Butler, Clifford Scott) – 3:06
 "Honey" (Seymour Simons, Haven Gillespie, Richard A. Whiting) – 2:31
 "Easy" (Doggett, Danny Small) – 2:33
 "Hammer Head" (Doggett, Scott, Shep Shepherd) – 2:58
 "Ram-Bunk-Shush" (Jimmy Mundy, Lucky Millinder) – 2:36
 "Chloe" (Niel Moret, Gus Kahn) 2:57
 "Hot Ginger" (Doggett, Scott) – 2:47
 "King Bee" (Doggett) — 2:42
 "What a Diff'rence a Day Made" (María Grever, Stanley Adams) – 2:57
 "Shindig" (Henry Glover) – 2:24

Personnel
Bill Doggett – organ
Clifford Scott – tenor saxophone, alto saxophone, flute, French horn (tracks 1, 3, 6, 7, 9, 11 & 12)
Percy France – tenor saxophone (tracks 2, 5, 10, & 11)
Irving "Skinny" Brown – tenor saxophone (track 4)
Clifford Bush (track 4), Billy Butler (tracks 1, 3, 6-9, 11 & 12), Jerry Lane (tracks 2, 5 & 10) – guitar
Abie Baker (tracks 3, 6 & 9), Edwyn Conley (track 7), Al Lucas (track 11), Clarence Mack (tracks 2, 4, 5 & 10), Johnny Pate (tracks 1 & 12), Carl Pruitt (track 9) – bass
Shep Shepherd – drums
Thomas "Bean" Bowles (tracks 1 & 12), Leslie Johnakins (tracks 3, 6 & 9) – baritone saxophone
Ray Barretto, Elwood Frazier – percussion (track 9)

References 

King Records (United States) albums
Bill Doggett albums
1957 albums